"Seattle" is a song composed by Hugo Montenegro with lyrics by Jack Keller and Ernie Sheldon. It was used as the theme for the 1968–1970 ABC-TV United States television show Here Come the Brides, which was set in 19th-century Seattle, Washington.

Performances

Perry Como and Bobby Sherman versions
Late in the show's first season, singer Perry Como recorded a version of the song, which became a Top 40 hit for him on the Billboard Hot 100 singles charts in early 1969. One of the stars of Here Come the Brides, pop singer Bobby Sherman, also recorded a version of the song, but his version was never released as a single. Connie Smith also recorded the song that same year on her Connie's Country LP.

Series theme versions
Two different versions were used as the theme for the television series, for both of which Montenegro conducted an in-studio orchestra: the first was instrumental; and the second was vocal, with its lyrics being sung by a musical team called "The New Establishment."

Game Theory version
The power pop group Game Theory recorded the song in 1986. The recording was not released until 1993, when it appeared as a bonus track on the CD release of the 1986 album The Big Shot Chronicles. The song also appears on the album's 2016 reissue.

Other versions
"Seattle" is sung by the Seattle Sounders FC's supporter groups, during matches, specifically at the kickoff of each half.

References

External links
[ Seattle], 1969 Perry Como album — information at AllMusic.com
[ The Very Best of Bobby Sherman], album — information at AllMusic.com

1969 singles
Perry Como songs
Songs written by Jack Keller (songwriter)
1968 songs
Seattle
Comedy television theme songs